Route 214 is a short collector road in the Canadian province of Nova Scotia.

It is located in Hants County and connects Elmsdale at Trunk 2 with Lower Nine Mile River at Trunk 14.

Communities along Route 214
Elmsdale
Belnan
Upper Nine Mile River

Local roads served
Garden Road
Elmbel Road

See also
List of Nova Scotia provincial highways

References

Nova Scotia provincial highways
Roads in Hants County, Nova Scotia